The Man-Eating Tree is a Finnish atmospheric gothic metal band. The band formed in 2009 in the city of Oulu.

History

Vine (2009–2010) 
The band started in 2009 when Vesa and Miika planned to make a new band after the break of Sentenced. They were looking for a new and different vocalist but Miika's life came to a sudden end in February 2009. One surprise and turn took place only days after Miika's funeral. Vesa Ranta found the vocalist of the band – Tuomas Tuominen. The final line-up was ready: Tuomas Tuominen, Janne Markus, Antti Karhu, Mikko Uusimaa, Heidi Määttä. First demo recordings were made in the spring and summer of 2009. In 2010, the first album Vine was made a reality. Producer was Hiili Hiilesmaa. The band kicked off with a No. 3 on the Finnish charts for their first single "Out of the Wind". After releasing their debut album Vine (2010) outside of Finland, Century Media Records signed The Man-Eating Tree worldwide. They made an extensive Finnish tour supporting bands such as Bullet for My Valentine, Katatonia, KYPCK and after that joined Tarot for a big Europe tour.

Harvest (2010–2011) 
The band returned soon to studio to record their second album "Harvest" again with Hiili Hiilesmaa as a producer. This time the crew is strengthened by Antti Karhu. Now the band is on a tour with Amorphis and Leprous. Now they are going to be on a tour with Swallow the Sun in Finland.

In the Absence of Light (2015) 
After four years, the band released their third album on 20 March 2015. This album featured vocals from the band's new vocalist Antti Kumpulainen.

Band members

Current members 
 Janne Markus – guitar (2009–present)
 Antti Kumpulainen – vocals (2013–present)
 Marco Sneck – keyboards (2016–present)
 Samuli Lindberg – drums (2018–present)

Former members 
 Aaron Rantonen – guitar (2009)
 Tuomas Tuominen – vocals (2009–2013)
 Heidi Määttä – keyboard (2009–2013)
 Mikko Uusimaa – bass (2009–2015)
 Antti Karhu – guitar (2011–2015)
 Vesa Ranta – drums (2009–2017)
 Altti Veteläinen – bass (2016–2018)
 Jami Heikkala – guitar (2016–2018)

Session members 
 Aksu Hanttu – drums (2011–2012)
 Antti Karhu – guitar, backing vocals (2011)
 Miika "Viiru" Pesonen – guitar (2012)
 Rauli Alaruikka – bass (2013)
 Jami Heikkala – guitar (2015–2016)

Discography

Studio albums 
 Vine (2010)
 Harvest (2011)
 In the Absence of Light (2015)

DVD 
 The Making of "Harvest"

Singles 
 "Out of the Wind" (2010)
 "Vultures" (2010)

Videography 
 "Out of the Wind" (2010)
 "This Longitude of Sleep" (2010)
 "Amended" (2010)
 "Of Birth for Passing" (2011)
 "Armed" (2011)
 "Code of Surrender" (2012)
 "Incendere" (2012)

References

External links 
 
 

Finnish gothic metal musical groups
Musical groups established in 2009
People from Oulu